"Good Thing"  is a song by British R&B girl group Eternal, released as the third single from their second album, Power of a Woman, on 26 February 1996. The song reached  8 in the United Kingdom and stayed in the top 100 for eight weeks. It was their seventh non-consecutive top-10 hit in the UK.

Track listings
UK CD1 and cassette single
 "Good Thing" (radio mix)
 "Stay"
 "So Good"
 "Oh Baby I..."

UK CD2 and Australasian CD single
 "Good Thing" (radio mix)
 "Good Thing" (Frankie Knuckles vocal club mix)
 "Good Thing" (Bottom Dollar vocal club mix)
 "Good Thing" (D.A.R.C. Velvet mix)

Credits and personnel
Credits are adapted from the Power of a Woman album booklet.

Studio
 Mastered at The Master Room (London, England)

Personnel

 David Frank – writing
 Jeff Pescetto – writing
 Kevin Armstrong – guitar
 Ronnie Wilson – production
 Dennis Charles – production
 Nick Hopkins – recording engineer

 Andy Bradfield – mix engineer
 Ashley Alexander – assistant engineer
 Paul Meehan – programming
 Sam Noel – technician
 Arun Chakraverty – mastering

Charts

References

1995 songs
1996 singles
EMI Records singles
Eternal (band) songs
First Avenue Records singles
Songs written by Jeff Pescetto